Mansfield Town Football Club is an English professional association football club based in Mansfield, Nottinghamshire. As of the 2016–17 season, they play in League Two, the fourth tier level of the English football league system. The club was formed in 1897 as Mansfield Wesleyans. In 1906, the club turned professional, after which the Methodist church disowned the club and forbade them to use the name "Wesleyans". The club reacted by changing its name to Mansfield Wesley, before adopting the current name Mansfield Town in 1910.

The club began its existence playing in the Mansfield and District Amateur League. In 1911, Mansfield became a founding member of a new league, the Central Alliance. In 1919, the club moved to Field Mill, which remains their ground to this date, and in 1921, the club joined the Midland League. In 1924, the club applied to join the Football League, but was turned down. The club unsuccessfully applied several times to join the northern section of Football League's Third Division. However, in 1931, the club changed tactics and applied for membership in the southern section, and was finally elected to the league. The following season, Mansfield was transferred to the northern section to replace Wigan Borough who had folded during the previous season. The club remained in the bottom two divisions of the league with the exception of a single season at the second tier in 1977–78. The club also won the Football League Trophy in 1987, and defeated West Ham United to reach the quarter-finals of the FA Cup in 1968–69. In 2007–08, Mansfield Town was relegated to the Football Conference. They won promotion back to the Football League in 2012–13.

Goalkeeper Rod Arnold owns the club record for most games played for Mansfield Town. He made a total of 513 appearances for the club, 440 of those being in the league, between 1971 and 1984. Sandy Pate is second on Mansfield's all-time appearance list with 479 first-team games (413 in the league). Defenders Don Bradley, Kevin Bird and George Foster, the latter of whom also served as manager of the club, have also played more than 400 matches for Mansfield Town. Harry Johnson owns the club's all-time goalscoring record, with 114 goals. Incidentally, Johnson is also Sheffield United's all-time top goalscorer, having scored more than 200 goals for the Blades. Ken Wagstaff is second on the list with 106 goals, while Steve Wilkinson is third with 91 goals. The record for most goals in a single season belongs to Ted Harston, who scored 55 goals for Mansfield in the 1936–37 season, and was subsequently sold to Liverpool.

Players with 50 or more appearances
The list comprises players with at least 50 first-team appearances, or 25 first-team goals for Mansfield Town since the club was elected to The Football League in 1931. Appearances and goals are for matches in the Football League (including playoffs and the war-abandoned 1939–40 season), Conference National, FA Cup, League Cup, Football League Trophy, FA Trophy, Conference League Cup, as well as the now-defunct Football League Group Cup, Anglo-Scottish Cup, Watney Cup, Third Division North Cup and Third Division South Cup. Substitute appearances are included.

The career field in the table indicates the seasons in which the player was on Mansfield's books. For instance, if the field says 1982–1991, it means this player played his first game for Mansfield in the 1982–83 season, and his last game for the club in the 1990–91 season, but not necessarily in every intervening season. However, if the player had two or more separate spells with the club, this is indicated with separate time periods in the table.

Statistics correct as of the end of the 2015–16 season. Current Mansfield Town players (as of 18 August 2016) listed in bold.

Position key:
GK – Goalkeeper; 
FB – Full-back;
CD – Central defender;
MF – Midfielder;
WI – Winger;
FW – Forward

Sources

References

Players
 
Mansfield Town
Association football player non-biographical articles